Hyperchlorhydria, sometimes called chlorhydria, sour stomach or acid stomach,  refers to the state in the stomach where gastric acid levels are higher than the reference range. The combining forms of the name (chlor- + hydr-), referring to chlorine and hydrogen, are the same as those in the name of hydrochloric acid, which is the active constituent of gastric acid.

In humans, the normal pH is around 1 to 3, which varies throughout the day.  The highest basal secretion levels are in the late evening (around 12 A.M. to 3 A.M.).  Hyperchlorhydria is usually defined as having a pH less than 2.  It has no negative consequences unless other conditions are also present such as gastroesophageal reflux disease (GERD).

A cause for hyperchlorhydria is increased Gastrin production

See also
 Achlorhydria
 Hypochlorhydria

References

Gastrointestinal tract disorders
Human physiology